Franciszek Giebartowski (18 June 1902 – 4 September 1968) was a Polish footballer. He played in three matches for the Poland national football team in 1926.

References

External links
 

1902 births
1968 deaths
Polish footballers
Poland international footballers
Place of birth missing
Association footballers not categorized by position